Norgestrel, sold under the brand name Ovral among others, is a progestin medication which is used in birth control pills and in menopausal hormone therapy. It is available both in combination with an estrogen and alone. It is taken by mouth.

Side effects of norgestrel include menstrual irregularities, headaches, nausea, breast tenderness, mood changes, acne, increased hair growth, and others. Norgestrel is a progestin, or a synthetic progestogen, and hence is an agonist of the progesterone receptor, the biological target of progestogens like progesterone. It has weak androgenic activity and no other important hormonal activity.

Norgestrel was patented in 1961 and came into medical use, specifically in birth control pills, in 1966. It was subsequently introduced for use in menopausal hormone therapy as well. Norgestrel is sometimes referred to as a "second-generation" progestin. It is marketed widely throughout the world. Norgestrel is available as a generic medication. In 2020, the version with ethinylestradiol was the 316th most commonly prescribed medication in the United States, with more than 900thousand prescriptions.

Medical uses
Norgestrel is used in combination with ethinylestradiol or quinestrol in combined birth control pills, alone in progestogen-only birth control pills, and in combination with estradiol or conjugated estrogens in menopausal hormone therapy. It has also been used as an emergency contraceptive in the Yuzpe regimen.

Side effects

Pharmacology

Pharmacodynamics

Norgestrel is a progestogen, or an agonist of the progesterone receptor. The biological activity of norgestrel lies in the levo enantiomer, levonorgestrel, whereas the dextro isomer is inactive. As such, norgestrel is identical in its hormonal activity to levonorgestrel except that it is half as potent by weight. Levonorgestrel, and by extension norgestrel, have some androgenic activity, but no estrogenic, antimineralocorticoid, or glucocorticoid activity.

The ovulation-inhibiting dose of norgestrel appears to be greater than 75μg/day, as ovulation occurred in 50 to 75% of cycles with this dosage of norgestrel in studies. The ovulation-inhibiting dosage of levonorgestrel, which is twice as potent as norgestrel, is approximately 50 to 60μg/day. One review lists the ovulation-inhibiting dose of norgestrel as 100μg/day. The endometrial transformation dose of norgestrel is listed as 12mg per cycle and the menstrual delay test dose of norgestrel is listed as 0.5 to 2mg/day.

Pharmacokinetics

The pharmacokinetics of norgestrel have been reviewed.

Chemistry

Norgestrel, also known as rac-13-ethyl-17α-ethynyl-19-nortestosterone or as rac-13-ethyl-17α-ethynylestr-4-en-17β-ol-3-one, is a synthetic estrane steroid and a derivative of testosterone. It is a racemic mixture of stereoisomers dextronorgestrel (the C13α isomer; l-norgestrel, L-norgestrel, or (+)-norgestrel) and levonorgestrel (the C13β isomer; d-norgestrel, D-norgestrel, or (–)-norgestrel), the former of which is inactive (making norgestrel exactly half as potent as levonorgestrel). Norgestrel is more specifically a derivative of norethisterone (17α-ethynyl-19-nortestosterone) and is a member of the gonane (18-methylestrane) subgroup of the 19-nortestosterone family of progestins.

Synthesis
Chemical syntheses of norgestrel have been published.

History
Norgestrel was first introduced, as a birth control pill in combination with ethinylestradiol, under the brand name Eugynon in Germany in 1966. It was subsequently marketed as a combined birth control pill with ethinylestradiol in the United States under the brand name Ovral in 1968, and was marketed in many other countries as well.

Society and culture

Generic names
It is also known as dl-norgestrel, DL-norgestrel, or (±)-norgestrel.

Brand names
Norgestrel has been marketed under a variety of brand names including Cyclacur, Cryselle, Cyclo-Progynova, Duoluton, Elinest, Eugynon, Microgynon, Lo/Ovral, Low-Ogestrel, Logynon, Microlut, Minicon, Nordette, Neogest, Ogestrel, Ovral, Ovran, Ovranette, Ovrette, Planovar, Prempak, Progyluton, and Trinordiol among others.

See also
 Elsimar M. Coutinho
 Herchel Smith

References

Tertiary alcohols
Ethynyl compounds
Androgens and anabolic steroids
Estranes
Hormonal contraception
Ketones
Progestogens